The Çarşı Hamam (in Turkish meaning "market bath") is an Ottoman bath (hamam) in the town of Mytilene in Lesbos, Greece. 

It was probably built in the first quarter of the 19th century, and formed part of the nearby Yeni ("New") Mosque complex. As its name indicates, it was the main market bath for the local neighbourhood. Its layout follows the typical three-part procession from cold to warm found in Ottoman and Roman baths. The bath underwent a restoration in 2000–2001 and is open to the public for visits.

References

Buildings and structures completed in the 19th century
Buildings and structures in Mytilene
Ottoman baths in Greece
19th-century architecture in Greece